Lonaconing is a town in Allegany County, Maryland, United States, located along the Georges Creek Valley. It is part of the Cumberland, MD-WV Metropolitan Statistical Area. The population was 1,214 at the 2010 census.

History 
The first non-Native American settlers in the late 18th century were explorers, hunters and farmers. Surnames of some of the first settlers were Dye, Duckworth, Green, Grindle, Fazenbaker, Grove, VanBuskirk, Knapp, and Miller. The first stone house, built in 1790, in Knapps Meadow, just north of Lonaconing, was owned by Samuel VanBuskirk. The house still stands and is a private residence as of 2016.  The Lonaconing Historic District was listed on the National Register of Historic Places in 1983.

Lonaconing is the birthplace of Baseball Hall of Fame pitcher Robert Moses ("Lefty") Grove, (1900-1975), who played notably for the old Baltimore Orioles, 1920–1925, during their famous string of six straight championships in the "Triple A" (AAA) minor league level of the International League, and later for Connie Mack's Philadelphia Athletics, (1925-1933) and the Boston Red Sox, 1934–1941, of the American League. Grove's "Most Valuable Player" Award is the only one not on display at the National Baseball Hall of Fame in Cooperstown, New York, as it is displayed at the George's Creek Library of the Western Maryland Regional Library system.

On January 20, 2021, the fourth largest Powerball and sixth largest lottery jackpot ticket in U.S. history was sold at Coney Market, a convenience store in Lonaconing, to an anonymous winner.

Lonaconing glassware manufacturers
 1914-1915: Dugan Glass
 1914-1918: Lonaconing Glass
 1919-1929: Utility Glass Works
 1930-1934: Sloan Bros Glass Company

Early mining railroads
Iron and coal companies in Lonaconing built railroads in the 1840s, in anticipation of connecting with the Baltimore and Ohio Railroad (B&O) and the Chesapeake and Ohio Canal. Some of these mining companies owned and operated their own railroad equipment. The Georges Creek Rail Road was built south from Lonaconing to connect with the Baltimore & Ohio at Piedmont(WV) All of the rail lines were absorbed into the Cumberland and Pennsylvania Railroad (C&P) by 1870.

The Lonaconing Furnace (1836–1855)
The Georges Creek Coal and Iron Company constructed and operated a blast furnace in Lonaconing from 1836 to 1855 along with constructing and operating the related Georges Creek Railroad from 1851 to 1863. The Lonaconing Furnace was listed on the National Register of Historic Places in 1973.

Demographics

2010 census
As of the census of 2010, there were 1,214 people, 463 households, and 303 families living in the town. The racial makeup of the town was 98.1% White, 0.3% African American, 0.2% Asian, and 1.4% from two or more races. Hispanic or Latino of any race were 0.5% of the population.

There were 463 households, of which 30.9% had children under the age of 18 living with them, 47.3% were married couples living together, 13.4% had a female householder with no husband present, 4.8% had a male householder with no wife present, and 34.6% were non-families. 31.1% of all households were made up of individuals, and 15.6% had someone living alone who was 65 years of age or older. The average household size was 2.48 and the average family size was 3.08.

The median age in the town was 40.5 years. 23.8% of residents were under the age of 18; 8.3% were between the ages of 18 and 24; 24.3% were from 25 to 44; 22.9% were from 45 to 64; and 20.5% were 65 years of age or older. The gender makeup of the town was 47.2% male and 52.8% female.

2000 census
As of the census of 2000, there were 1,205 people, 482 households, and 290 families living in the town. The racial makeup of the town was 98.67% White, 0.66% African American, 0.08% Pacific Islander, 0.08% from other races, and 0.50% from two or more races. Hispanic or Latino of any race were 0.50% of the population. At 16.1 percent Scottish, Lonaconing is the most Scottish town in the United States.

There were 482 households, out of which 28.0% had children under the age of 18 living with them, 46.9% were married couples living together, 10.0% had a female householder with no husband present, and 39.8% were non-families. 36.1% of all households were made up of individuals, and 21.8% had someone living alone who was 65 years of age or older. The average household size was 2.37 and the average family size was 3.15.

In the town, the population was spread out, with 23.9% under the age of 18, 8.1% from 18 to 24, 25.9% from 25 to 44, 19.5% from 45 to 64, and 22.6% who were 65 years of age or older. The median age was 38 years. For every 100 females, there were 83.7 males. For every 100 females age 18 and over, there were 75.0 males.

The median income for a household in the town was $27,434, and the median income for a family was $37,083. Males had a median income of $27,315 versus $19,423 for females. The per capita income for the town was $13,890. About 12.8% of families and 19.6% of the population were below the poverty line, including 30.3% of those under age 18 and 17.7% of those age 65 or over.

Geography
Lonaconing is located at  (39.564884, -78.979312).

Schools 
Westmar Middle School was opened in the fall of 2007 when it was relocated to Lonaconing after the closure of the Westmar Middle School facility in Westernport.  Prior to the fall of 2007, the building was occupied by Westmar High School, originally Valley High School, which was established in 1953 and renamed "Westmar" during the 1989–1990 school year, three years after the consolidation of Bruce High School in 1986.  Westmar High School closed, vacating the building for future use a middle school, following the 2006–2007 school year after which the populations of Westmar and Beall High schools consolidated into the newly built Mountain Ridge High School in Frostburg.

Georges Creek Elementary was opened in 1975 with the closing of Central School. It combined populations with Barton Elementary in 2000. The school has approximately 380 students.

Transportation

The main method of travel to and from Lonaconing is by road. The only significant highway serving the town is Maryland Route 36, which also serves as Main Street. MD 36 heads northward towards Frostburg and Interstate 68, while to the south, it terminates at the town of Westernport.

Notable person
 Robert Moses (Lefty) Grove (1900-1975), professional baseball pitcher, member of the National Baseball Hall of Fame
Ruth Bear Levy (1898-1994), painter and writer, who published a memoir -- using her oil paintings as illustrations -- entitled "A Wee Bit O' Scotland: Growing Up in Lonaconing at the Turn of the Century." Also, she authored a two-part article, "Recollections of Lefty Grove: Baseball's Greatest Left-Handed Pitcher," for the Maryland Historical Magazine.

See also 
 Big Savage Mountain

References

External links

 George's Creek Mine payroll, 1906 from Western Maryland Public Libraries

Towns in Maryland
Towns in Allegany County, Maryland
Georges Creek Valley
Cumberland, MD-WV MSA
Scottish-American culture in Maryland